The 1986 Houston Cougars football team represented the University of Houston during the 1986 NCAA Division I-A football season. The Cougars were led by 25th-year head coach Bill Yeoman and played their home games at the Astrodome in Houston, Texas. The team competed as members of the Southwest Conference, finishing in last. Following a dismal 1–10 season, and amidst mounting controversy surrounding alleged NCAA rule violations, Bill Yeoman resigned as head coach. He retired as Houston's longest serving and winningest coach by wide margins.

Schedule

Source:

References

Houston
Houston Cougars football seasons
Houston Cougars football